Jacob Hart Ela (July 18, 1820 – August 21, 1884) was an American politician and a U.S. Representative from New Hampshire.

Early life
Born in Rochester, New Hampshire, Ela attended the village school in Rochester. At fourteen years of age he was apprenticed in a woolen manufactory and subsequently learned the printer's trade.

Career
Ela served as member of the New Hampshire House of Representatives in 1857 and 1858 and as United States marshal from July 1861 to October 1866.

Elected as a Republican to the Fortieth and Forty-first Congresses, Ela served as United States Representative for the 1st congressional district or the state of New Hampshire (March 4, 1867 – March 3, 1871). He served as chairman of the Committee on Expenditures in the Department of the Interior (Forty-first Congress).

Ela was appointed by President Grant as Fifth Auditor of the Treasury on January 1, 1872, and served until June 2, 1881. On June 3, 1881, he was appointed Auditor of the Treasury for the Post Office Department and served in that position until his death.

Death
Ela died in Washington, D.C., on August 21, 1884 (age 64 years, 34 days). He is interred at Rochester Cemetery, Rochester, Strafford County, New Hampshire.

Family life
The name Ela first comes to the US in the late 1630s, and the US family originates from Haverhill, Massachusetts, in the early 16th century, where the Ela family cemetery is located at Walnut Hill Cemetery in Haverhill, Massachusetts.

Ela married the widow, Abigail (Moore) Kelley and they had three sons, Frederic P., Wendell P., and Charles S. Abigail died in September 1879, and he married Mary Handerson on October 2, 1880.

References

External links

 

1820 births
1884 deaths
Republican Party members of the New Hampshire House of Representatives
People from Rochester, New Hampshire
United States Marshals
Republican Party members of the United States House of Representatives from New Hampshire
19th-century American politicians